Marco Filomeno (born 8 June 1965) is a retired Italian football forward and later manager.

References

1965 births
Living people
Italian footballers
FC Schaffhausen players
FC St. Gallen players
FC Winterthur players
Association football forwards
Swiss Super League players
Italian football managers
FC Schaffhausen managers